The Cochiti Dam is an earthen fill dam located on the Rio Grande in Sandoval County, New Mexico, approximately  north of Albuquerque, New Mexico, in the United States. By volume of material, it is the 23rd largest dam in the world at 62,849,000 yd3 (48,052,000 m3) of material, one of the ten largest such dams in the United States, and the eleventh largest such dam in the world. Cochiti Dam is one of the four United States Army Corps of Engineers projects for flood and sediment control on the Rio Grande system, operating in conjunction with Abiquiu Dam, Galisteo Dam and Jemez Canyon Dam.

Description

Cochiti Dam is primarily a flood control dam built to ameliorate the effects of heavy runoff. The dam and the resultant lake also had the secondary purposes of creating recreational and wildlife habitat resources. The outlet works of the dam have an outflow capacity of 14,790 feet3/s (418.8 m3/s).

Cochiti Dam is operated to bypass all inflow to the lake to the extent that downstream channel conditions are capable of safely bypassing the flow. Flood-control operations are initiated when inflow to the lake is in excess of the downstream channel capacity. Stored floodwaters are released when downstream channel conditions permit, all in accordance with the provisions of Public Law 86-645 and the Rio Grande Compact.

Cochiti Dam marks the beginning of the Middle Rio Grande Conservancy District (MRGCD), Cochiti Division. It controls runoff water from an  drainage area.

History

Cochiti Dam was authorized under the Flood Control Act of 1960 for a construction cost of US$94.4 million.  The act was further amended in 1964 to allocate water resources for the development of fish and wildlife resources as well as recreational resources.  of water was allocated under this amendment for initial pool fill and sufficient resources were allocated to offset annual evaporation losses. This water was to come from water previously diverted into the Rio Grande system by Public Law 87-843 of 1962 from water in the Colorado River basin via the San Juan-Chama Project across the Continental Divide.

Construction began in 1965. Impoundment of water in Cochiti Lake began in 1973.  Archaeological surveys were made prior to filling of the lake.  The filling of the lake inundated the Cochiti Diversion Dam which had previously been used for irrigation purposes, and which had been rehabilitated by the United States Bureau of Reclamation in 1958 as part of the Middle Rio Grande Project.  The new dam replaced this functionality.

Construction of the dam was opposed by the Cochiti Keres Pueblo people, who lost significant tracts of agricultural land as a result of the construction and subsequent pool filling. The Cochiti Keres filed a lawsuit against the Army Corps of Engineers regarding the inundation of their lands, winning the suit. In 2001, the Army Corps of Engineers made a public apology to the Cochiti Keres .

Cochiti Lake

Cochiti Lake has maintained a permanent recreation pool of approximately  since the dam was completed. The permanent pool was established by and is maintained by San Juan-Chama Project water. The elevation of the lake at surface of the normal pool is 5,335 ft (1626 m) above sea level.

There are two public recreation areas on the lake, one on the west side of the lake at Cochiti Recreation Area and one on the east at Tetilla Peak Recreation Area.  Other lands around the lake are owned by and are part of the Pueblo de Cochiti Indian Reservation and are not open to the public. A visitor center is open to the public near the park headquarters. Fishing is permitted on the lake, with smallmouth bass and northern pike species among other species being available.  Cochiti Lake is a no-wake lake, and boats are restricted to trolling speeds.

References

External links

 Cochiti Lake Recreation Area official site
 Bureau of Reclamation fact sheet for Cochiti Lake
 Cochiti Lake community website
 Geologic Map of the Cochiti Dam Quadrangle, Sandoval County, New Mexico United States Geological Survey

Dams in New Mexico
Landmarks in New Mexico
Buildings and structures in Sandoval County, New Mexico
United States Army Corps of Engineers dams
Dams completed in 1973
Dams on the Rio Grande
1973 establishments in New Mexico